Kassim Koné (born 30 December 1986) is a professional footballer from Côte d'Ivoire.

Notes and references

Living people
Ivorian footballers
Expatriate footballers in Thailand
1986 births
Kassim Kone
Association football forwards
Association football midfielders
Ivorian expatriate sportspeople in Thailand